Pisolamia is a genus of very small ectoparasitic sea snails, marine gastropod mollusks or micromollusks in the family Eulimidae.

Species
Species within the genera Pisolamia include:
 Pisolamia brychia (Watson, 1883)
Species brought into synonymy
 Pisolamia abyssorum (P. Fischer MS, Locard, 1897): synonym of Pisolamia brychia (Watson, 1883)

References

 Gofas, S.; Le Renard, J.; Bouchet, P. (2001). Mollusca, in: Costello, M.J. et al. (Ed.) (2001). European register of marine species: a check-list of the marine species in Europe and a bibliography of guides to their identification. Collection Patrimoines Naturels, 50: pp. 180–213

Eulimidae